Marit Tusvik (born 13 March 1951, in Høyanger) is a Norwegian author, poet and playwright. Tusvik's works have been translated into multiple languages.

Bibliography
Reisa til mandarinlandet – poetry (1979)
Mellom sol og måne – poetry (1984)
I byen under byen – poetry (1985)
Jorunn og Janfrid – children's book (1986)
Hestehov – poetry (1987)
Katrine – small book (1987)
Kua som fraus – children's book  (1988)
Bruno Andante og wobbegongen – children's book  (1989)
Hareungen som blei åleine – children's book  (1990)
Mugg – play (1990)
Petter Larsens dag- og nattbok – children's book  (1991)
Ishuset – novel (1991)
Etter William – play (1993)
Alle vakre jenters hambo – play (1994)
Kvalross i bikini – children's book (1994)
Bell – novel (1995)
Hører du månen – film play (1996)
Gjennomtrekk – poetry (1997)
Barnas teaterbok – nonfiction for children (1997) (together with Jan E. Hansen & Mari Maurstad)
Tsaren – play (1998)
Nord – novel (1999)
Stille og fint – novel (2002)
Proppen – children's book  (2002, illustrated by the author)
Den forunderlige historia om Valdemar Blå og reisa gjennom havet – children's book  (2003, illustrated by the author)
Angerhøy – play (2005)
Sigrid Finne– novel (2007)
Samlede dikt– poems (2008)

Prizes
Sokneprest Alfred Andersson-Ryssts fund 1986
Ibsen Prize 1991
Nynorsk Literature Prize 1991
Mads Wiel Nygaards Endowment 1991
Narvesens kulturpris 1995
Amalie Skram-prisen 1999
Dobloug Prize 2004

References and notes

External links
Marit Tusvik's biography and bibliography at Aschehoug Agency

1951 births
Living people
Dobloug Prize winners
20th-century Norwegian poets
Norwegian children's writers
Norwegian dramatists and playwrights
20th-century Norwegian novelists
21st-century Norwegian novelists
21st-century Norwegian poets
Norwegian women poets
Norwegian women novelists
21st-century Norwegian women writers
20th-century Norwegian women writers
People from Høyanger